America is 1976 album by Julio Iglesias. It was released on the Alhambra label. In December 1976 it was No.2 on the Billboard chart in New York.

Track listing

Charts

Weekly charts

Year-end charts

Certifications and sales

References

Sources and external links
 Julio Iglesias Discography

1975 albums
Julio Iglesias albums
Spanish-language albums